Earl Peak is a  mountain summit located on the edge of the Alpine Lakes Wilderness, in Kittitas County of Washington state. Earl Peak is the eighth-highest point in the Teanaway area of the Wenatchee Mountains. It is situated two miles southwest of Navaho Peak, on land managed by Wenatchee National Forest. Precipitation runoff from the peak drains south into tributaries of the Teanaway River, or north into Hardscrabble Creek which is part of the Wenatchee River drainage basin. The view from the summit of this peak showcases the impressive Mount Stuart and Stuart Range for those who climb it.

Climate

Lying east of the Cascade crest, the area around Earl Peak is a bit drier than areas to the west. Summers can bring warm temperatures and occasional thunderstorms. Most weather fronts originate in the Pacific Ocean, and travel east toward the Cascade Mountains. As fronts approach, they are forced upward by the peaks of the Cascade Range, causing them to drop their moisture in the form of rain or snowfall onto the Cascades (Orographic lift). As a result, the eastern slopes of the Cascades experience lower precipitation than the western slopes. During winter months, weather is usually cloudy, but, due to high pressure systems over the Pacific Ocean that intensify during summer months, there is often little or no cloud cover during the summer.

See also

 Geology of the Pacific Northwest

References

External links
 Earl Peak:  weather forecast
 Climbing Earl Peak video: YouTube

Gallery

Mountains of Kittitas County, Washington
Mountains of Washington (state)
Wenatchee National Forest
Cascade Range
North American 2000 m summits